A B M Shahidul Islam, known as S.I. Tutul, is a Bangladeshi singer and musician who is the lead singer and lead guitarist of the Dhrubotara Band. He also works in the Bangladeshi film industry. He won Bangladesh National Film Awards for Best Music Director (Daruchini Dwip, 2007), Best Music Composer (Bapjaner Bioscope, 2015) and Best Male Playback Singer (Bhalobaslei Ghor Bandha Jay Na, 2010; Bapjaner Bioscope, 2015).

Musical career
Tutul was a founding member of the band LRB. In 2005, he founded a band called "Face to Face" which was later renamed to Dhrubotara in 2011.

In 2006, Bangladesh won an international film award from the International Film Festival in Chennai for the film 'Nirontor. Tutul was the music director of the film, which was selected as a Bangladeshi submission for Academy Award in 2006.'

In 2005, filmmaker Mostofa Sarwar Farooki offered Tutul a movie called Bachelor which was a success and brought him nationwide fame as a composer.  The movie won a number of international awards, especially for the song ‘Keu Prem Kore’ (‘Everyone Loves’) which was a hit in Bangladesh and was tuned, composed and sung by S I Tutul.

Personal life
Tutul was first married to actress-model Tania Ahmed in 1999 and they were divorced in 2021 after five years of separation. He has three sons named Tawab, Sreyash and Arosh. On 4 July 2022, he married Sharmina Siraj Sonia, a television presenter based in the United States.

Awards
Tutul won an international award in 2006 as a music director for the film Nirontor from International Film Festival in Chennai, along with several other awards.

References

External links
 
 
 
 Tutul’s band to release 20 songs soon .theindependentbd
 

Living people
People from Kushtia District
Bangladeshi male musicians
Bangladeshi music directors
Bangladeshi composers
Bangladeshi guitarists
Best Music Director National Film Award (Bangladesh) winners
Best Male Playback Singer National Film Award (Bangladesh) winners
Best Music Composer National Film Award (Bangladesh) winners
Place of birth missing (living people)
Date of birth missing (living people)
Year of birth missing (living people)